Tillandsia makoyana is a species of flowering plant in the Bromeliaceae family. This species is native to Costa Rica and Mexico.

References

makoyana
Flora of Costa Rica
Flora of Mexico
Taxa named by John Gilbert Baker